Irši Parish is an administrative unit of Aizkraukle Municipality in the Vidzeme region of Latvia.

Towns, villages and settlements of Irši parish 
Irši

Parishes of Latvia
Aizkraukle Municipality
Vidzeme